The Caleuche Awards are Chilean honors given to reward the acting profession for the best performances of the season, in movies, television serials, series and miniseries, and comedies. They were created and organized by the Corporation of Actors of Chile (Chileactores), in conjunction with VTR.

The awards are given according to a vote of all members of Chileactores. A jury chooses the nominees in leading and supporting performances in each one of the four categories: Cinema, TV Serial, TV Miniseries or Series, and Comedy.

Award
Every year, the prize organization holds an open contest for plastic artists in the area of sculpture, design, or other related disciplines, for the fashioning of the award to be presented to all winners at the ceremony. The statue designed for the first edition was made by the outstanding Chilean sculptor . This was inspired by the bodily expression of the acting profession, and conceived according to the etymology of the word caleuche, which means "people who are transformed".

Categories
There are 13 awards given within the four main categories. In addition, recognitions of Career and Breakthrough are made with two special prizes.

Cinema
 Best Leading Actor
 Best Leading Actress
 Best Supporting Actor
 Best Supporting Actress

TV Serial
 Best Leading Actor
 Best Leading Actress
 Best Supporting Actor
 Best Supporting Actress

TV Miniseries/Series
 Best Leading Actor
 Best Leading Actress
 Best Supporting Actor
 Best Supporting Actress

Comedy
 Best Comedian

Special Awards
 Lifetime Achievement Award
 Breakthrough Award
 Audience Award (since 2017)

Ceremonies

Winners

Cinema

TV Serial

TV Series or Miniseries

Comedy

Special Awards

Statistics

Most wins

Most nominations

See also
 Altazor Award
 Pedro Sienna Awards
 Latin American television awards

References

External links
 

2016 establishments in Chile
Awards established in 2016
Chilean film awards
Television awards